Tillandsia × nidus is a natural hybrid (T. fasciculata × T. ionantha) of the genus Tillandsia. This plant is endemic to Mexico.

References

nidus
Flora of Mexico
Plant nothospecies